Walter A. McEwen,  (born January 31, 1940) is a lawyer and former Canadian politician, who served in the Legislative Assembly of Prince Edward Island from 1989 to 1996.

He is the son of Ted McEwen and Mary Burke and was educated at Saint Dunstan's University, receiving a BSc, and Dalhousie University, where he studied law. In 1965, he married Myrna Nicholson. After graduating from Dalhousie in 1971, McEwen moved to Toronto and was admitted to the Ontario bar in March 1973. He then returned to Prince Edward Island, was admitted to the bar in October 1973 and set up practice in Summerside. He was named Queen's Counsel in 1986.

A member of the Liberal Party, he represented the electoral district of 5th Prince. McEwen served in the province's Executive Council as Minister of Provincial Affairs, Attorney General and Minister of Health and Social Services. After he retired from politics, McEwen returned to the practice of law. He also served as a member of the National Parole Board of Canada.

References 
 

1940 births
Living people
Canadian King's Counsel
Dalhousie University alumni
Lawyers in Prince Edward Island
Members of the Executive Council of Prince Edward Island
People from Kings County, Prince Edward Island
Progressive Conservative Party of Prince Edward Island MLAs
Saint Dunstan's University alumni